Mother is an advertising agency with offices in London, New York, Los Angeles, Shanghai and Berlin.

History
Founded around a London kitchen table in 1996 by Mark Waites, Stef Calcraft, Libby Brockhoff, and Robert Saville, Mother today has over 500 employees around the world and a dedicated design arm (Mother Design), and works with clients including IKEA, KFC, Stella Artois, Target, Sky and Diageo.

The agency's work includes the early Levi’s Odyssey spoof for Lilt, its celebrity-fronted "Goldspot" cinema adverts for Orange, "Here Come The Girls" for Boots, and the PG Tips campaign featuring Al and Monkey. Recent campaigns include the story of 'Rang-Tan', first with Greenpeace, then Iceland ; waking the world up to the devastation caused by dirty palm oil, KFC's 2018 'FCK' apology or its much in demand 'Gravy Candle', and IKEA's 'The Wonderful Everyday' campaign.

Offices
Mother moved to its current offices in London's Shoreditch in 2004, designed by Clive Wilkinson architects.

Notable campaigns

Amnesty International
Mother were the lead agency and co-executive producers for The Secret Policeman’s Ball  for the fiftieth anniversary of Amnesty International. The show took place in the United States for the first time on March 4, 2012 at Radio City Music Hall in New York City, and featured a mix of prominent comedians from both Britain and the United States. After a taped introduction by Archbishop Desmond Tutu, the live comedy lineup included Jon Stewart, Russell Brand, Eddie Izzard, Ben Stiller, Fred Armisen, Kristen Wiig, David Walliams, Jimmy Carr, Noel Fielding, Matt Berry, Micky Flanagan, Jack Whitehall, Tim Roth, Bill Hader (as Julian Assange), Rex Lee (as Kim Jong-Un), and a cameo appearance by Richard Branson. Liam Neeson also introduced a set from formerly imprisoned Burmese comedian and political activist Zarganar. In between the comedic performances, the music lineup consisted of Mumford & Sons, Reggie Watts, and a concluding set by Coldplay. Additionally, Beavis and Butthead appeared in an animated sequence and former Monty Python members Michael Palin, Eric Idle, and Terry Jones appeared in pre-recorded video segments explaining comedically why they were not there. At several moments in the show, Statler and Waldorf from the Muppets commented on the event and spoke to the performers from one of the balconies. The event was streamed live on Epix, and broadcast on Channel 4 in the UK.

Al and Monkey
In 2001 Mother created Al and Monkey to promote ITV Digital, a campaign that was named Campaign of the Year by Campaign Magazine. After the channel's closure, Mother brought the characters back as the face of PG Tips.

Boots
In Christmas 2007, Mother created ‘Here come the girls’ for Boots. The award-winning campaign has continued and evolved into the current campaign of comedy vignettes.

Coca-Cola 'Move to the Beat'
Mother were the creative agency that created Coca-Cola’s global campaign ‘Move to the Beat’ for the 2012 Olympic Games. Featuring Mark Ronson and singer Katy B, the campaign features the new Coca-Cola anthem for the Olympic Games ‘Anywhere in the World’ which uses the sounds of music, sport and Coca-Cola to create a unique rhythmic beat. Ronson used innovative recording techniques as he travelled the world to capture the sounds of the Coca-Cola Move to the Beat athletes– five Olympic hopefuls chosen for their sporting prowess and inspirational stories: GB table tennis player Darius Knight; US hurdler David Oliver; Russian sprinter Kseniya Vdovina; Singapore archer Dayyan Jaffar, and Mexican taekwondo martial artist María del Rosario Espinoza. A documentary showing Ronson travelling around the world capturing the sound of sport was aired on Channel 4 in the UK.

Missing Sounds Of New York
Missing Sounds of New York is an album made by The New York Public Library, released on 1 May 2020 through advertising agency Mother New York. The album was recorded during the 2020 COVID-19 quarantine period in New York City. It includes original and archived audio to replicate the sounds of New York City prior to lockdown.

The album was launched on Spotify and SoundCloud. To date the album has garnered more than 350,000 streams online.

Pablo the Drug Mule Dog
Mother worked with the COI's drugs awareness brief resulting in Mother re-branding the National Drugs Helpline as "FRANK". The FRANK campaign also included the creation of Pablo the Drug Mule Dog voiced by David Mitchell of ‘Mitchell and Webb’. The campaign won the Best of Show award at the IPA Best of Health Awards 2009

Pimms' O'Clock
Mother created the "Pimm’s O’Clock" series of adverts featuring Harry Fitzgibbon Simms, ambassador for Pimms. Harry’s character is played by Alexander Armstrong from the popular comedy duo Armstrong and Miller.

Orange Gold Spots
Mother London worked on the Orange Gold spot campaign from 2003 to 2009. Amongst many notable film stars the campaign featured Snoop Dogg, Patrick Swayze, Verne Troyer, Rob Lowe, Rob Schneider and Anjelica Huston.

Stella Artois
Mother has been the creative agency for Stella Artois since 2008, working on the main line as well as Stella Artois 4%, Stella Artois Black and Stella Artois Cidre. The work for the brand, set in the 1960s French Riviera has won numerous awards both creatively and strategically. In 2011, Stella Artois were chosen as Advertiser of the Year by Campaign magazine.

DEVO
In 2010, the 1980s new-wave group DEVO and Warner Bros. Records hired Mother to help rebrand and develop content for the band for their first new album in 20 years, Something For Everybody. The campaign revolved around a series of videos and microsites touting the band's desire to create the most commercially viable product through focus group testing, online voting, and even opening a fictional new office called Mother LA in Los Angeles. The campaign culminated in a live streamed listening party, during which the record was played for a room full of cats.

References

External links
 Mother London
 Mother New York
 Mother Los Angeles
 Mother Shanghai

Advertising agencies of the United Kingdom
Marketing companies established in 1996